Nazrul Sangeet, also Nazrul Geeti, refers to the songs written and composed by Kazi Nazrul Islam, the national poet of Bangladesh. Nazrul Geeti incorporate revolutionary notions as well as more spiritual, philosophical and romantic themes. Nazrul wrote and composed nearly 4,000 songs (including gramophone records), which are widely popular in Bangladesh and India. Some of the most notable Nazrul Sangeet include Notuner Gaan, the national marching song of Bangladesh and O Mon Romzaner Oi Rozar Sheshe, an Islamic song on the festival of Eid-ul-Fitr and Jago Jogmaya Jago Mrinmoyee, a Durga Vandana on the festival of Durga Puja.

Background
Nazrul showed the symptoms of keen poetic and musical talent at his tender age and started writing songs when he was a member of a Leto group (Folk Musical Group). Following Kazi Bazle Karim, his uncle and a leader of a Leto group, he became an expert in composing songs and setting them to tunes. Joining the Leto group enhanced his musical career and put a significant impact on shaping his future musical life. At a very young age he was excelled in composing songs in different languages, apart from the Bengali language. He met Satish Kanjilal, a teacher of Searsol School who had an interest in classical music and some mastery over it. Observing Nazrul's irresistible inclination to music, Mr. Kanjilal imparted him some lessons on classical music. Later Nazrul widened hisknowledge on music when he was serving as a Havilder in Karachi Barrack under Bengal Regiment. He learned a great deal of Persian language, literature, and music with the help of a religious teacher from Punjab attached with the regiment.

Nazrul Islam's musical style

Revolutionary mass music
The mass music and poems of Kazi Nazrul Islam have been widely used during the Indian Independence Movement and Bangladesh Liberation War. The music is highly motivational and revolutionary in nature with strong and powerful words and captivating tunes. It talks about the extremities of everything. The lyrics of those songs are provoking, as they talk against conservatism and about life on a broader parameter of philosophy and spirituality. The beauty of Nazrul's mass music lies in the freedom of its expression, which also drew immense criticism. However, those who understood its philosophy praised the courage and straightforwardness.

Ghazal
Nazrul's acquaintance with the tradition of Persian Ghazals, a form of love songs, was very significant in the sense that it paved the base of his successful efforts in composing Bengali Ghazals which he undertook by 1927–28. Bengali Ghazal is, it can be mentioned outright, an innovation by Kazi Nazrul Islam alone. It served as the first mass-level introduction of Islam into the mainstream tradition of Bengali music.

Historical influence
Nazrul used his music as a major way of disseminating his revolutionary notions, mainly by the use of strong words and powerful, but catchy, tunes. Among the revolutionary songs, Karar Oi Louho Kopat (Prison-doors of Steel) is best known and has been used in several movies, especially those made during the pre-independence period of Bangladesh.

Nazrul Geeti has recently been translated and recorded in Oriya (an Indian language) in the form of a studio album.

Notable songs

 Dolan Chapa (name of a faintly fragrant monsoon flower), poems and songs, 1923
 Bisher Bashi (The Poison Flute), poems and songs, 1924
 Bhangar Gan (The Song of Destruction), songs and poems, 1924 proscribe in 1924
 Chhayanat (The Raga of Chhayanat), poems and songs, 1925
 Chittanama (On Chittaranjan), poems and songs, 1925
 Samyabadi (The Proclaimer of Equality), poems and songs, 1926
 Puber Hawa (The Eastern Wind), poems and songs, 1926
 Sarbahara (The Proletariat), poems and songs, 1926
 Sindhu Hindol (The Undulation of the Sea), poems and songs, 1927
 Jinjir (Chain), poems and songs, 1928
 Pralaya Shikha (Doomsday Flame), poems and songs, 1930 proscribed in 1930
 Gumaite Dao Sranto Rabire (Let the tired Sun(Rabindranath) sleep), poems and songs, 1941.
 Shesh Saogat (The Last Offerings), poems and songs, 1958
 Notuner Gaan (The Song of Youth), 1928, National March of Bangladesh
 O Mon Romzaner Oi Rozar Sheshe Elo Khushir Eid, composed for Abbasuddin Ahmed, 1932

Notable singers of Nazrul Sangeet

 Abbasuddin Ahmed
 Shusmita Anis
 Ferdous Ara
 Firoza Begum
 Asha Bhosle
 S. D. Burman
 Ajoy Chakrabarty
 Niaz Mohammad Chowdhury
 Alaka Das
 Chittaranjan Das
 Manas Kumar Das
 Sudhin Das
 Tapas Kumar Das
 Kamal Dasgupta
 Kanan Devi
 K C Dey
 Manna Dey
 Purabi Dutta
 Anup Ghoshal
 Anup Jalota
 Nashid Kamal
 Sabiha Mahboob
 Sadya Afreen Mallick
 Namrata Mohanty
 Manabendra Mukhopadhyay
 Mohammed Rafi
 Ferdausi Rahman
 Juthika Roy
 Haimanti Shukla
 Madhuri Chattopadhyay
 Ila Basu
 Shaheen Samad
 Kumar Sanu
 Indrani Sen
 Anuradha Paudwal
 Nilufar Yasmin

References

Bangladeshi literature
Bengali music
Bangladeshi music
Indian literature
Culture of Kolkata
Bangladeshi culture
Indian music
Indian culture
Kazi Nazrul Islam
Music of Bengal
Indian styles of music